Take 30 (also expressed as Take Thirty) was a Canadian television newsmagazine series, which aired on CBC Television from 1962 to 1984 for 2,500 episodes. An afternoon series originally designed as a "women's show", the series gradually evolved into a showcase for serious journalism, airing documentary reports and interviews on social and cultural topics.

Despite the title, the series at times aired in a 35-minute timeslot, as was the case in late 1965.

The program's original hosts were Anna Cameron and Paul Soles. In 1965, Cameron left and was replaced by Adrienne Clarkson. During his time on the show, Soles was also a busy voiceover actor for animation, best known for shows such as Rudolph the Red-Nosed Reindeer and Spider-Man, both of which were produced concurrent with his work on Take 30; he was also a regular on the comedic game show This is the Law during this time.

Clarkson left the show in 1975 to become a host of The Fifth Estate, and was replaced by Mary Lou Finlay. Finlay left in 1977, and was replaced by Hana Gartner; Soles left the following year and was replaced by Harry Brown. Gartner left in 1982 and was replaced in the show's final season by Nadine Berger.

Other contributors to the show included Jehane Benoît, Charles Lynch, Rita Deverell and Moses Znaimer.

In some years, the CBC summer schedule repeated episodes from the past season, supplemented by shows produced in cities outside Toronto, titled in the 30 From ... format, such as 30 From Vancouver.

External links
CBC Digital Archives: 30 From Vancouver
CBC Digital Archives: Take 30
 Queen's University Directory of CBC Television Series (Take 30 archived listing link via archive.org)

References

1960s Canadian television news shows
1970s Canadian television news shows
1980s Canadian television news shows
CBC Television original programming
1962 Canadian television series debuts
1983 Canadian television series endings
CBC News